Walter Koch may refer to:

 Walter Koch (astrologer) (1895–1970), German astrologer
 Walter Koch (paratrooper) (1910–1943), German World War II paratrooper
 Walter Koch (physician) (1880–1962), German physician
 Walter J. Koch (born 1961), American scientist
 Walter Koch (1911–1998), business owner of Machwitz Kaffee